Securities and Exchange Commission may refer to:

U.S. Securities and Exchange Commission
Cyprus Securities and Exchange Commission
Bangladesh Securities and Exchange Commission
Securities and Exchange Commission of Myanmar
Securities and Exchange Commission (Philippines)
Securities and Exchange Commission (Nigeria)
Securities and Exchange Commission of Pakistan
Polish Securities and Exchange Commission